Michael Gwisdek (14 January 1942 – 22 September 2020) was a German actor and film director.

Career
He began his acting career in East Germany and has appeared in more than 130 films and television shows since 1968. His debut film as a director, Treffen in Travers, was the first East-German film screened at the 1989 Cannes Film Festival in the Un Certain Regard section. His 1998 film The Big Mambo was entered into the 48th Berlin International Film Festival. The following year, he won the Silver Bear for Best Actor at the 49th Berlin International Film Festival, for his role in the film Nightshapes.

He married the actress Corinna Harfouch in 1985 and they divorced in 1997. They had two sons together before they married; the musician Johannes Gwisdek (born 1980) and the actor Robert Gwisdek (born 1984). He married his second wife, Gabriela, shortly after divorcing Harfouch. 

Gwisdek died on 22 September 2020 aged 78.

Selected filmography

 Jadup and Boel (1980)
 Woman Doctors (1984)
 Sansibar oder Der letzte Grund (1987)
 Just for Horror (1987- produced)
 Treffen in Travers (1988 - directed)
 Pestalozzi's Mountain (1989)
 Coming Out (1989)<ref name="defa"/
 Herzlich willkommen (1990)
 Walerjan Wrobel's Homesickness (1991)
 The Tango Player (1991)
  (1992, TV film)
  (1994)
  (1998)
 The Big Mambo (1998 - directed)
 Nightshapes (1999)
 No Place to Go (2000)
 Vaya con Dios (2002)
 Good Bye, Lenin! (2003)
 Herr Lehmann (2003)
 Speer und Er (2005)
 Pornorama (2007)
  (2009)
 Boxhagener Platz (2010)
  (2011)
 A Coffee In Berlin (2012)
  (2013)
 The Silent Revolution (2018)

References

External links

 

1942 births
2020 deaths
German male film actors
German male television actors
East German actors
Male actors from Berlin
Ernst Busch Academy of Dramatic Arts alumni
Silver Bear for Best Actor winners
20th-century German male actors
Film directors from Berlin
German male screenwriters
German Film Award winners